Jubilee Pocket is a locality in the Whitsunday Region, Queensland, Australia.

Geography 
Flat land in the north and centre of the suburb. The more mountainous land around the eastern, southern and western boundaries is national park. Shute Harbour Road passes through the north of the locality. Jubilee Pocket is known for poor mobile reception due to these mountains and is associated with midges (a type of mosquito) that can be numerous and pose a nuisance to visitors and residents.

The Proserpine–Shute Harbour Road (State Route 59) passes through the locality from north to east.

History 
Jubilee Pocket comprises part of the former locality of Jubilee.

Amenities 
There is a caravan park and camping ground on Shute Harbour Road on the north-western edge of the locality.

References

External links 

Whitsunday Region
Localities in Queensland